Qianheng (乾亨) was a Chinese era name used by several emperors of China. It may refer to:

Qianheng (917–925), era name used by Liu Yan (emperor), emperor of Southern Han
Qianheng (979–983), era name used by Emperor Jingzong of Liao